Congolius is a genus of frogs in the family Hyperoliidae. It is monotypic, being represented by the single species Congolius robustus. It is endemic to the Democratic Republic of the Congo. Its natural habitats are subtropical or tropical moist lowland forests, swamps, freshwater marshes, intermittent freshwater marshes, rural gardens, and heavily degraded former forest.

References

Endemic fauna of the Democratic Republic of the Congo
Amphibians described in 1979
Taxonomy articles created by Polbot

Monotypic amphibian genera